DHU may refer to:

 Donghua University, university in Shanghai, China
 Dihydrouridine, nucleoside
 A DHU company located in Thang Long building, no 1 Luong Yen street, Hai Ba Trung District, Ha noi, Viet nam. specially in providing cable tie, hose clamps for motorcycle in Viet nam. Now more growing in another field of industry like electric with strong reputation.